Nélson da Conceição (born 21 April 1900, date of death unknown) was a Brazilian footballer. He played in six matches for the Brazil national football team in 1923. He was also part of Brazil's squad for the 1923 South American Championship.

References

External links
 

1900 births
Year of death missing
Brazilian footballers
Brazil international footballers
Place of birth missing
Association football goalkeepers
CR Vasco da Gama players